Giovanni Panciera (born 27 December 1954) is an Italian speed skater. He competed in the men's 1500 metres event at the 1976 Winter Olympics.

References

External links
 

1954 births
Living people
Italian male speed skaters
Olympic speed skaters of Italy
Speed skaters at the 1976 Winter Olympics
People from Cortina d'Ampezzo
Sportspeople from the Province of Belluno